The Harvest is the debut album of American rapper Boondox, released on July 11, 2006.

Music and lyrics 
The eponymous harvest is a metaphor for the rewards one reaps at death for all the seeds of hatred and pain planted by others in the "very large field called Life."

Recording

For his debut album, Boondox collaborated with producers Mike E. Clark, Brian Kuma, Dr. Punch, Fritz The Cat, Tino Grosse and Eric Davie. The album featured guest verses by Insane Clown Posse, Twiztid, Axe Murder Boyz and Blaze Ya Dead Homie.

Reception
The album did not chart on the Billboard 200, but did on the Independent album charts and top Heatseekers.

Track listing

Personnel

Vocals, Lyrics
Boondox
Insane Clown Posse - (5)
Axe Murder Boyz - (9)
Twiztid - (12)
Blaze Ya Dead Homie - (12)

Additional Vocals
Carlito Hill - (2)
Savannah Hill - (2)
Violent J - (3, 8, 10)
The Rude Boy - (4)
Jenny - (6)
Mike E. Clark - (10)
Otis - (13)

Production
Boondox - (2, 3, 4, 5, 6, 7, 8, 9, 10, 11, 12, 13)
Dr. Punch - (2, 3, 4, 5, 7, 8, 10, 11, 12, 13)
Insane Clown Posse - (6)
Axe Murder Boyz - (9)
Twiztid - (12)
Blaze Ya Dead Homie - (12)
Mike E. Clark - Music Written, programmed, played - (2, 3, 4, 6, 8, 10, 11, 12, 13)
Tino Grosse - Music written, programmed, played - (3)
Kuma - Music written, programmed, played - (5, 7, 9)

Other Production (Engineering)
Fritz "The Cat" Van Kosky  - (2, 3, 4, 6, 8, 10, 11, 12, 13)
Kuma - (2, 3, 4, 5, 6, 7, 8, 9, 10, 11, 13)
Dr. Punch - (2, 3, 4, 5, 6, 7, 8, 9, 11, 12, 13)
Mike E. Clark - (10)
Eric Davie - (10)

Other Production (Mixed)
Fritz "The Cat" Van Kosky - (2, 3, 4, 5, 6, 7, 8, 9, 10, 11, 12, 13)
Kuma - (2, 3, 4, 5, 6, 7, 8, 9, 10, 11, 12, 13)
Dr. Punch - (2, 3, 4, 5, 6, 7, 8, 9, 10, 11, 12, 13)

Charts

References

2006 debut albums
Albums produced by Mike E. Clark
Boondox albums
Psychopathic Records albums